Cochlostomatinae are a family of small land snails which have operculums and gills. These are terrestrial gastropod mollusks in the superfamily Cyclophoroidea.

Distribution
These snails live in the limestone mountains of southern Europe and North Africa.

Genera
Genera in the family Cochlostomatidae include:
 Apolloniana Brandt, 1958
 Cochlostoma Jan 1830
 † Electrea Klebs, 1886 
 Obscurella Clessin, 1889
 † Proelektrea Hrubesch, 1965 
 Rara A. J. Wagner, 1897
 Rhabdotakra A. J. Wagner, 1897
 Striolata A. J. Wagner, 1897
 Genera brought into synonymy
 Apricana Caziot, 1908: synonym of Obscurella Clessin, 1889
 Auritus Westerlund, 1883: synonym of Cochlostoma (Auritus) Westerlund, 1883 represented as Cochlostoma Jan, 1830
 Crassilabriana Fagot, 1891: synonym of Obscurella Clessin, 1889
 Elektrea [sic] †: synonym of Electrea Klebs, 1886 † (incorrect subsequent spelling)
 Hartmannia Newton, 1891: synonym of Cochlostoma (Turritus) Westerlund, 1883 represented as Cochlostoma Jan, 1830
 Hidalgoiana Fagot, 1891: synonym of Obscurella Clessin, 1889
 Holcopoma Kobelt & Möllendorff, 1899: synonym of Cochlostoma (Auritus) Westerlund, 1883 represented as Cochlostoma Jan, 1830
 Imerezia Zallot, Groenenberg, De Mattia, Fehér & E. Gittenberger, 2015: synonym of Rara A. J. Wagner, 1897
 Neglectiana Fagot, 1891: synonym of Obscurella Clessin, 1889
 Nouletiana Fagot, 1891: synonym of Obscurella Clessin, 1889
 Obscuriana Fagot, 1891: synonym of Obscurella Clessin, 1889
 Partiotiana Fagot, 1891: synonym of Obscurella Clessin, 1889
 Patuliana Caziot, 1908: synonym of Cochlostoma (Turritus) Westerlund, 1883 represented as Cochlostoma Jan, 1830
 Personatus Westerlund, 1883: synonym of Cochlostoma (Auritus) Westerlund, 1883 represented as Cochlostoma Jan, 1830
 Pleuropoma A. J. Wagner, 1897: synonym of Cochlostoma (Auritus) Westerlund, 1883 represented as Cochlostoma Jan, 1830
 Pleuropomatia Tomlin, 1929: synonym of Cochlostoma (Auritus) Westerlund, 1883 represented as Cochlostoma Jan, 1830
 Stereopoma A. J. Wagner, 1897: synonym of Cochlostoma (Turritus) Westerlund, 1883 represented as Cochlostoma Jan, 1830 (junior synonym)
 Striolatiana Caziot, 1908: synonym of Striolata A. J. Wagner, 1897
 Strobelia Clessin, 1889: synonym of Cochlostoma (Eupomatias) A. J. Wagner, 1897 represented as Cochlostoma Jan, 1830 (Invalid: junior homonym of Strobelia Rondani, 1868 [Diptera], Eupomatias has the same type species)
 Toffolettia Giusti, 1971: synonym of Striolata A. J. Wagner, 1897 (junior synonym)
 Wagneriola Zallot, Groenenberg, De Mattia, Fehér & E. Gittenberger, 2015: synonym of Cochlostoma (Scalarina) A. J. Wagner, 1897 represented as Cochlostoma Jan, 1830 (objective junior homonym)

References

External links 

Cyclophoroidea